Gotfred Jensen (November 20, 1872 in Denmark – December 26, 1945) was a United States Army soldier who received the Medal of Honor for actions during the Philippine–American War. He was a member of Young's Scouts and was one of thirteen Scouts awarded the Medal between 16 and May 19, 1899. Sergeant Jensen is buried in Veteran's Home Cemetery in Port Orchard, Washington.

Medal of Honor citation
Rank and Organization: Private, Company D, 1st North Dakota Volunteer Infantry. Place and Date: At San Miguel de Mayumo, Luzon, Philippine Islands, May 13, 1899. Entered Service At: Devils Lake, N. Dak. Birth: Denmark. Date of Issue: June 6, 1906.

Citation:

With 11 other scouts, without waiting for the supporting battalion to aid them or to get into a position to do so, charged over a distance of about 150 yards and completely routed about 300 of the enemy, who were in line and in a position that could only be carried by a frontal attack.

See also
List of Medal of Honor recipients

Notes

References

United States Army soldiers
Danish emigrants to the United States
1872 births
1945 deaths
United States Army Medal of Honor recipients
American military personnel of the Philippine–American War
People from Ramsey County, North Dakota
Foreign-born Medal of Honor recipients
Philippine–American War recipients of the Medal of Honor